Nighthawk is a fictional character, a cowboy in the DC Comics universe. His real name is Hannibal Hawkes and he first appeared in Western Comics #5. In his secret identity, he worked as a traveling repairman. He had a sidekick named Jim Peyton.

Created by Joe Millard and Charles Paris, his later adventures were handled by writers France Herron, Don Cameron, and Gardner Fox; and artists Gil Kane and Carmine Infantino.

Fictional character biography
He was shown as dying during Crisis on Infinite Earths, although this has been retconned twice to fit in with the later revelation that he was a reincarnation of Prince Khufu — who would later be reincarnated as Carter Hall, the Golden Age Hawkman. Current continuity has it that he was shot by a criminal named Matilda Roderic, who was presumably a reincarnation of the evil priest Hath-Set, who is apparently destined to kill Khufu in every life. Roderic's descendant is the current Hath-Set.

The 2002 retcon also revealed he was the partner and lover of the Western heroine Cinnamon, who was the reincarnation of Khufu's wife Chay-Ara.

Nighthawk appears in Guy Gardner #24 during the Zero Hour incident. He sported white sideburns at this point in time. His group of allies, which includes El Diablo and Bat Lash, were forming to take on the villain Extant and several men Extant had brainwashed. Nighthawk calls this group the "Rough Bunch" on more than one occasion. The time-lost heroes Steel, Supergirl, Guy Gardner and a version of Batgirl show up to help in the fight.

A modern-day version of the character appears in the Western-themed Robin (vol. 2) Annual #6, as a mercenary. He worked with Robin and the modern day Pow Wow Smith to track down the modern day Trigger Twins. They have a literal Main Street showdown in a Western-themed tourist attraction located near Gotham City.

The New 52
Nighthawk appears in The New 52 issue All Star Western. Nighthawk's new origin is that he left home as a child and worked on a whaling boat. The captain, a former slave, became a second father to him and Nighthawk was there when the man died. This death inspired Nighthawk to fight for justice and for the oppressed. Nighthawk is teamed with Cinnamon once again. Nighthawk uses a special medallion he found at an Indian burial site which gives him enhanced strength and healing abilities.

In other media
Nighthawk's alien abduction from issue #3 of Crisis on Infinite Earths is adapted into the song "Westerner" by French-Canadian electro-rock band Judge Rock.

References

Comics characters introduced in 1948
DC Comics Western (genre) characters
DC Comics characters with accelerated healing
DC Comics male characters
Fictional mercenaries in comics
Golden Age adventure heroes
Western (genre) gunfighters